The national flag of Slovenia features three equal horizontal bands of white (top), blue, and red, with the coat of arms of Slovenia located in the upper hoist side of the flag centered in the white and blue bands. The coat of arms is a shield with the image of Mount Triglav, Slovenia's highest peak, in white against a blue background at the center; beneath it are two wavy blue lines representing the Adriatic Sea and local rivers, and above it are three six-pointed golden stars arranged in an inverted triangle which are taken from the coat of arms of the Counts of Celje, the great Slovene dynastic house of the late 14th and early 15th centuries.

The flag's colors are considered to be Pan-Slavic, but they actually come from the medieval coat of arms of the Duchy of Carniola, consisting of 3 stars, a mountain, and three colors (red, blue, yellow). crescent. The existing Slovene tricolor was raised for the first time in history during the Revolution of 1848 by the Slovene Romantic nationalist activist and poet Lovro Toman on 7 April 1848, in Ljubljana, in response to a German flag which was raised on top of Ljubljana Castle.

The civil and state ensign for ships has the same design as the national flag, but a different shape (2:3 instead of 1:2). Boats up to  use the national flag as an ensign. The naval jack uses colors of the coat of arms, a white, blue, and yellow horizontal tricolor.

Historical development

Origins

The white-blue-red Slovene flag was first raised on 7 April 1848, on a building between Congress Square and Prešeren Square in Ljubljana, by a group of nationally minded students led by the prominent liberal nationalist activist and poet Lovro Toman. Despite opposition from the local ethnic Germans it was subsequently recognized by the Austrian Government as the official flag of Carniola. This formal recognition, albeit on a regional level, was an exception to the policy of the Austrian Government which tended to persecute national symbols of the non-German nationalities in the Empire.

In addition, Austrian authorities saw all tricolors as basically nationalist and potentially revolutionary symbols, so Austrian provinces (as the Empire itself) were only allowed to use bicolors (the only exception being the flag of the Kingdom of Croatia and Slavonia, since it was interpreted to be a combination of the Croatian and Slavonian bicolors). So the official recognition of the Carniolan white-blue-red tricolor instead of the traditional white-blue bicolor was seen as a major achievement by the Slovenes and it quickly became the symbol representing the idea of United Slovenia. In the second half of the 19th century, the Slovene national tricolor became the only truly all-Slovene symbol, representing all Slovenes, regardless of the historical region in which they lived.

The tricolor flag continued to be associated with Slovenia during the country's incorporation into Yugoslavia, although officially the whole kingdom including Slovenia had the same flag, in this case, the blue-white-red. In the interwar period, it was also used by the Slovenes of the Julian March that were annexed to Italy, where it was prohibited and persecuted by the fascist regime.

Slovene flags during and after WWII

During World War II The Slovene national colors were used both by  the Partisan Resistance Movement (usually with a red star in the middle) and by the Slovene Home Guard, the voluntary anti-Communist militia sponsored and supported by the Nazi German occupation forces.

In 1945 a red star was officially placed on the flag of the Socialist Republic of Slovenia, a constituent of the Socialist Yugoslavia.

Flag of independent Slovenia

Following Slovene independence from Yugoslavia, the red star was removed and the new coat of arms, designed by Marko Pogačnik, was added. The flag was officially adopted on 27 June 1991, following a long and controversial dispute about the coat of arms of the new Republic.

Government (maritime) flags
These flags are used on naval vessels only.

Naval jacks

Other flags

Colours

References

External links

 
 Slovene flag proposals
 Britannica.com

National symbols of Slovenia
Slovenia
 
Slovenia